The Kuala Penyu District is an administrative district in the Malaysian state of Sabah, part of the Interior Division which includes the districts of Beaufort, Keningau, Kuala Penyu, Nabawan, Sipitang, Tambunan and Tenom. The capital of the district is in Kuala Penyu Town.

History 
Kuala Penyu was declared as full district in the year 1975 and established as focal point for administrative and business centre. This district call as Kuala Penyu - derived from  a group stones forming types of "Turtle" or call penyu situated at river bank or Kuala (in Malay). In early 60's this area was popularly known as "sitompok" whereby it refers to a group of stones.

Demographics 

The population of the Kuala Penyu district according to the last census in the year 2010 is 18,958 inhabitants and consists mainly of Kadazan or Dusun Tatana, which make up the largest ethnic group. There are also a significant number of illegal immigrants from the nearby southern Philippines, mainly from Sulu Archipelago and Mindanao which are not included in the population statistics.

Tourism 
It is one of the gateways to Pulau Tiga National Park, where Survivor: Borneo was set. Kuala Penyu is also famous for its beaches, especially Tempurung beach, Sawangan beach and Sungai Labuan Waterfront. Sungai Labuan, as the name implies was taken from the name of a river flowing in the heart of Kuala Penyu. Pesta Rumbia is a special celebration for "Sago" trees which are only planted widely in the district. This festive season targets to promote "sago" as traditional food and multi purpose product with full of nutrition. More recently Kuala Penyu's surrounding long, deserted beaches have brought in both international and local tourists to the area. Positioned perfectly for a sun rise, or sunset, depending on which side of the peninsular you are, the location is proving to be a 'weekend hot spot' for those escaping the city life. In addition, Kuala Penyu district also hosts a minor seaport or jetty and a major gateway to the island destination of Labuan through the town of Menumbok where ro-ro ferries depart and arrive for the daily Labuan-Sabah ferry crossings.

Gallery

See also 
 Districts of Malaysia

References

Further reading

External links 

  Kuala Penyu District Council
  Kuala Penyu District Office